Bossemptélé is a sub-prefecture of Ouham-Pendé in the Central African Republic.

Geography 

Administration 
The municipality of Binon is the only commune of the sub-prefecture.  In 2003, it had 18,024 inhabitants.

Civil war  

On 18 January 2014 Anti-balaka militias murdered more than 100 people in Bossemptélé. On 1 March 2014 African peacekeepers evacuated 190 people from Bossemptélé, but 65 people were left behind including women, children and people with disabilities who were unable to climb onto the trucks. In April French forces came to the town and Anti-balaka fighters dismantled their checkpoints and returned to local villages. On 19 December 2020 MINUSCA forces were deployed in Bossemptélé after it was captured by CPC rebels. On 8 February 2021 the town was recaptured by government forces.

References 

Sub-prefectures of the Central African Republic
Populated places in the Central African Republic